Antonis Kyriazis (born 14 April 1997) is a Greek professional footballer who plays as a striker for Gamma Ethniki club Proodeftiki.

Honours
AEK Athens
Greek Cup: 2015–16

References

1997 births
Living people
Greece youth international footballers
Greek expatriate footballers
Super League Greece players
Gamma Ethniki players
Cypriot Second Division players
AEK Athens F.C. players
A.E. Kifisia F.C. players
Aris Limassol FC players
Association football forwards
Footballers from Athens
Greek footballers
Greek expatriate sportspeople in Cyprus
Expatriate footballers in Cyprus